Bandak  is a lake in the municipalities of Kviteseid and Tokke in Vestfold og Telemark county, Norway. The lake, which is part of the Telemark Canal route, belongs to the Skien watershed. The river Tokke flows into the lake, and the outlet is via the river Straumane, which flows to the lake Kviteseidvatn.

The deepest part of the lake reaches  which makes it the eighth deepest lake in Norway.

See also
List of lakes in Norway

References

Tokke
Kviteseid
Lakes of Vestfold og Telemark